Leslie Clarence Klink (August 11, 1926 - June 22, 2018) was an American politician in the state of Iowa.

Klink was born in Littleport, Iowa. He attended Elkader High School and Iowa State University and following service in Korea, worked as a farmer, specialising in beef production.

He served in the Iowa State Senate from 1969 to 1971 as a Republican. He served as the Clayton County Finance Chairman for the Republican party.

References

1926 births
2018 deaths
People from Clayton County, Iowa
Farmers from Iowa
Republican Party Iowa state senators